Uyai is the second studio album by Ibibio Sound Machine, released on March 3, 2017. It is the first album released by Merge Records since joining the label in 2016.

Reception

Uyai was well-received by contemporary music critics upon its initial release.  At Metacritic, which assigns a normalized rating out of 100 to reviews from mainstream publications, the album received an average score of 84, based on 12 reviews, indicating "universal acclaim".

Reviewing the album for AllMusic, critic Paul Thompson wrote that "With this release, the eight-member group continues its blend of West African rhythms, disco, funk, and electro, adding a bit more post-punk and new wave this time around. Dynamic frontwoman Eno Williams is still the star of the show, and while many of her lyrics (sung in Ibibio and English) are still based on Nigerian folktales, this album is more socially conscious, reflecting on recent events and the general state of the world."

Track listing

Personnel
Adapted from the album's Bandcamp page
Eno Williams – Vocals
Alfred Kari Bannerman – Guitar
Anselmo Netto – Percussion
Jose Joyette – Drums
John McKenzie – Bass
Tony Hayden – Trombone, Synthesizer, Additional Production
Scott Baylis – Trumpet, Synthesizer
Max Grunhard – Alto & Baritone Saxophone, Synthesizer, Production, Engineer on all tracks except 'Trance Dance', Mixing

Additional Musicians
Derrick McIntyre – Bass on ‘Give Me a Reason’
CH Straatman – Bass on ‘Quiet’
Emmanuel Rentzos – Keyboard on ‘Guide You’ and ‘Pot Is On Fire’
Dan Leavers – Additional Production, Mixing, Additional Keyboard on ‘Give Me a Reason’, ‘Pot Is On Fire’ and ‘Joy’
Kristian Craig Robinson– Additional Production, Mixing, Mbira, Flute and Synthesizer on ‘One That Lights Up’
Affiong David Ekwere – Backing Vocals and Spoken Part on ‘The Chant’, Backing Vocals on ‘Guide You’
Marilyn David Huck – Backing Vocals on ‘The Chant’ and ‘Guide You’
Jaelee Small – Backing Vocals on ‘The Chant’ and ‘Pot Is On Fire’
Beth Mburu-Bowie – Backing Vocals on ‘The Chant’ and ‘Pot Is On Fire’

Additional Technical
Benedic Lamdin – Engineer on 'Trance Dance'
Guy Davie – Mastering
Vanessa DeJongh – Design
Daniel Murphy – Design
Dan Wilton – photography

References

2017 albums